Cormack Field House or "The Pit" is the track and field facility for the Virginia Military Institute (VMI) Keydets, located in Lexington, Virginia. It was VMI's home for basketball until 1981, when Cameron Hall was completed as the new VMI basketball arena. Cormack Field House is named after Walt Cormack, a VMI track coach for twenty-five years and who also started the "Winter Relays".

References 
 Cormac Field House Website

VMI Keydets basketball
College indoor track and field venues in the United States
Indoor track and field venues in the United States
Defunct college basketball venues in the United States
1930s establishments in Virginia
Basketball venues in Virginia
Athletics (track and field) venues in Virginia
VMI Keydets sports venues